All the Man You Need is the seventh studio album by American singer-songwriter Will Downing. It was released by Motown Records on July 18, 2000. The album was nominated in the Best Traditional R&B Vocal Album category at the 43rd Annual Grammy Awards.

Critical reception

AllMusic editor Ed Hogan found that though there "isn't a huge difference between this album and his R&B/smooth jazz-oriented recordings of the mid-to late '90s [...] Fans of Will Downing and adult-oriented R&B music will be thoroughly pleased." He further remarked: "Though the beats may hit a little harder and there's more adherence to R&B ballad song structure, the focus is still on Downing's warm baritone vocals, soothing production, and good songs. PopMatters critic Mark Anthony Neal felt that All the Man You Need was "not likely to change opinions of Downing's work, one way or the other, but when so many veteran artists seek gimmicks to reach new audiences, Downing seems secure to simply do what he does best."

Track listing

Sample credits
"Share My World" contains excerpts from "Superwoman" as performed by Noel Pointer.

Charts

References

2000 albums
Will Downing albums